The Bemidji State Beavers are a women's college hockey team representing Bemidji State University in Bemidji, Minnesota, United States. They play at the NCAA Division I level, and compete in the Western Collegiate Hockey Association (WCHA).

History

The Bemidji State University intercollegiate women's ice hockey program began competition in the 1998–1999 season. The first head coach was Ruthann Cantile.  She was head coach from the program's founding to the start of WCHA play, and the beginning of national NCAA Championships in 2001.

Over the next several years, Bemidji State met with little success, while playing against the best teams in the nation, in conference play.  The Beavers were able to recruit 2002 German Olympian Defender Nina Zieganhals in 2003.  After disappointing seasons under Jason Lesterberg (2000–01) and Bruce Olson, who left the program during the 2005–06 season, Bemidji State hired Steve Sertich for the 2006–07 season.  Sertich presided over the team for eight years until his retirement in 2014.

On February 27, 2010, Bemidji State ended its 14-game playoff losing streak in a 2–1 victory over St. Cloud State. The next day, the Beavers defeated St. Cloud State in Game 3, and advanced to the WCHA Final Face-Off for the first time in school history. Zuzana Tomcikova had 27 saves and the win was the Beavers 12th win of the season. It tied the school record for most wins in a season (accomplished in 2001–02). The Beavers advanced to play the Minnesota Duluth Bulldogs in the WCHA semi-finals but were eliminated.

On October 16, 2010, Beaver goaltender Alana McElhinney made a career-high 56 saves. In the game, Bemidji State had its first-ever win over a No. 1-ranked team as they defeated the Mercyhurst Lakers by a 5–3 mark. In addition, this was the second women's game ever played at the new Bemidji Regional Event Center.

October 29–30, 2010: Erin Cody had the biggest weekend of her collegiate career. She was involved in all seven of the Bemidji State's goals, as the Beavers swept St. Cloud State. Cody had five goals and two assists, and was a factor in both game-winning goals. Cody earned the First Star of the Game honors in both games. In the first game, Cody scored a natural hat trick (a power-play, shorthanded, and even-strength goal). All three goals were scored in the first period and set a Beavers record for most goals scored by a single player in one period. In the second game, Cody had two goals and two assists.

On January 28, 2012, the Badgers hosted a record crowd of 12,402 at the Kohl Center as Wisconsin swept the Bemidji State Beavers. Alex Rigby made 28 saves to obtain her sixth shutout of the campaign. Her rival between the pipes, Bemidji State goaltender Zuzana Tomcikova made 32 saves.

The Beavers made history on March 7, 2015, as they defeated the Minnesota Golden Gophers by a 1–0 tally in the semifinals of the WCHA Final Face-Off. The game-winning goal was scored by Stephanie Anderson in the third period. Beavers goaltender Brittni Mowat made 37 saves, registering her seventh shutout of the season, a new program record. In addition, it marked the first time that the Beavers advanced to the championship game of the WCHA Final Face-Off.

On February 29, 2020, the Bemidji State Beavers beat the Minnesota Duluth Bulldogs in the fourth overtime period of their WCHA Quarterfinal match, making it in the longest game in WCHA women's ice hockey history, and the second longest in NCAA history. Beaver forward Reece Hunt scored the game-winning goal at 8:43 of the fourth overtime. The game lasted four hours and 50 minutes, with 128:43 of on-ice time.  The final score was 2–1.  The victory marked Jim Scanlon's 100th win as head coach for Bemidji; he is the first coach in the women's ice hockey program's history to reach 100 wins.

Year by year

Current roster
As of August 21, 2022.

Olympians
 Nina Ziegenhals, defenseman, Germany; 2002 Winter Olympics
 Zuzana Tomcikova, goaltender, Slovak Republic; 2010 Winter Olympics

World Championships
 Stephanie Anderson, forward, North St. Paul, Minn. First Beaver player to win a gold medal in a world championship on April 4, 2015 when the United States National Team defeated Canada 7–5 to capture the 2015 IIHF World Championships in Malmo, Sweden.
 Ivana Bilic, played for Team Canada's Development Team, in the 2016 Nations Cup, January 4–6, 2016.

Beavers in professional hockey

Awards and honors
Reece Hunt, WCHA Rookie of the Month (February 2020)
Lauren Bench, WCHA Goaltender of the Month (December 2019)
Kerigan Dowhy, WCHA Goaltender of the Month (February 2018) 
Ivana Bilic, 2016 WCHA Defensive Player of the Year 
 Brittni Mowat, Goaltender, 2015 All-USCHO.com Women's Second-Team
 Jim Scanlan, Head Coach, 2015 USCHO.com National Coach of the Year
 Alexis Joyce, Defenseman, 2015 All-WCHA Rookie Team
Alexis Joyce, WCHA Defensive Player of the Week (Week of January 24, 2017)
Mak Langei, 2020-21 WCHA Student-Athlete of the Year 
 Brittni Mowat, Goaltender, 2015 All-WCHA First Team
 Brittni Mowat, Goaltender, 2015 CCM Hockey Women's Division I All-Americans, First Team
 Zuzana Tomcikova, Goaltender, 2012 CCM Hockey Women's Division I All-American: Second Team
 Zuzana Tomcikova, Goaltender, 2012 Patty Kazmaier Award nominee
 Steve Sertich, Head Coach, 2010 WCHA Coach of the Year 
 Zuzana Tomcikova, Goaltender, 2010 Co-WCHA Player of the Year
 Jill Luebke, Goaltender, 2003 WCHA All-Rookie team 
 Anik Cote, Goaltender, 2003 WCHA Student Athlete of the Year

See also
 Bemidji State Beavers men's ice hockey

References

External links
 BSU Women's Ice Hockey

 
Ice hockey teams in Minnesota